This is a list of football clubs based in Seychelles.
For a complete list see :Category:Football clubs in Seychelles

A
Anse Réunion FC (Anse Réunion)

B
Bambas bamblets FC

C
Côte d'Or FC (Praslin)

F
Foresters (Mont Fleuri)

K
Kanye Youth FC

L
La Passe FC (La Passe)
Light Stars FC (Grande Anse)

N
Northern Dynamo (Glacis)

Q
Quincy FC

R
Rovers FC

S
St Francis FC (Baie Lazare)
St Louis Suns United (Victoria)
St Michel United FC (Anse-aux-Pins)
St Roch United FC (Bel Ombre)
Super Magic Brothers

T
The Lions (Cascade)

 
Seychelles
Football clubs
Football clubs